Gordhanbhai Javia (born 9 March 1940) is an Indian politician. He was elected to the Lok Sabha, the lower house of the Parliament of India, from Porbandar in Gujarat as a member of the Bharatiya Janata Party.

References

External links
Official biographical sketch in Parliament of India website

India MPs 1999–2004
India MPs 1996–1997
India MPs 1998–1999
Bharatiya Janata Party politicians from Gujarat
1940 births
Lok Sabha members from Gujarat
Living people
People from Rajkot district
People from Porbandar district